Vevelstad Station is located at Langhus in Ski, Norway. On the Østfold Line, the station is served by the Oslo Commuter Rail line L2 operated by Vy with two hourly services. 

The station was opened in 1985. It was planned as one of two intermediate stations on the new Follo Line between Ski and Oslo, but has since been dismissed.

References

External links
 .

Railway stations in Ski, Norway
Railway stations on the Østfold Line
Railway stations opened in 1985
1985 establishments in Norway